Armand Penverne (26 November 1926 – 27 February 2012) was a French football defender and coach. He played the majority of his professional career for Stade de Reims winning four French championships and appearing in one European Cup final. He made 39 appearances for the France national team scoring twice. After retiring as a player, Penverne severed as coach of Olympique de Marseille from July to December 1962 before becoming the technical director of the local club La Ciotat during the 1963–64 season. On 28 February 2012, he died at the age of 85.

Honours
Reims
Division 1: 1948–49, 1952–53, 1954–55, 1957–58; runner-up: 1946–47, 1953–54
Coupe de France: 1949–50, 1957–58
Trophée des Champions: 1955, 1958
European Cup runner-up: 1955–56
Latin Cup: 1953; runner-up: 1955

References

External links

 
 
 
 

1926 births
2012 deaths
Sportspeople from Morbihan
Association football defenders
Footballers from Brittany
French footballers
Stade de Reims players
Red Star F.C. players
Limoges FC players
France international footballers
1954 FIFA World Cup players
1958 FIFA World Cup players
French football managers
Olympique de Marseille managers